An oath of allegiance is an oath whereby a subject or citizen acknowledges a duty of allegiance and swears loyalty to a monarch or a country. In modern republics, oaths are sworn to the country in general, or to the country's constitution. For example, officials in the United States, take an oath of office that includes swearing allegiance to the United States Constitution. However, typically in a constitutional monarchy, such as in the United Kingdom, Australia and other Commonwealth realms, oaths are sworn to the monarch. Armed forces typically require a military oath.

In feudal times, a person would also swear allegiance to his feudal superiors. To this day the oath sworn by freemen of the City of London contains an oath of obedience to the Lord Mayor of the City of London.

Oaths of allegiance are commonly required of newly naturalized citizens (see Oath of Citizenship), members of the armed forces, and those assuming public (particularly parliamentary and judicial) offices. Clergy in the Church of England are required to take an Oath of Supremacy acknowledging the authority of the British monarch.

A typical example of an oath of allegiance is that sworn by Members of Parliament in the Netherlands:

In many Commonwealth realms, all that is required is an oath to the monarch, and not the constitution or state. There have been moves in some of the realms to make the oath of citizenship sworn by new citizens refer to the country rather than the monarch. However, the oaths sworn by judges, members of parliament, etc., have not been changed. All of these moves have not succeeded as the King (or Queen if is female) is the personification of the Canadian, British, or Australian state (or that of any other Commonwealth realm). Allegiance sworn to the monarch is the same as to the country, its constitution or flag. The European Court of Human Rights ruled in 1999 that the oath of allegiance to a reigning monarch is "reasonably viewed as an affirmation of loyalty to the constitutional principles supporting the workings of representative democracy."

See also

1997 Constitution of Fiji: Chapter 17
Bay'ah
Hitler oath (Germany between the years 1934 and 1945)
Loyalty oath
National Pledge (India)
Oath of Allegiance (Australia)
Oath of Allegiance (Canada)
Oath of Allegiance (Ireland)
Oath of Allegiance (New Zealand) 
Oath of Allegiance (Philippines)
Oath of Allegiance (Sweden)
Oath of Allegiance (United Kingdom)
Oath of Allegiance (United States) 
Oath of Citizenship
Oath of Office
Patriotic Oath (Philippines)
Pledge of Allegiance (Philippines)
Pledge of Allegiance (United States)
Pledge of Allegiance to the Flag of South Korea
Rukun Negara
Singapore National Pledge
South African schools pledge

References

 
State ritual and ceremonies